Maryellen Noreika (born July 12, 1966) is a United States district judge of the United States District Court for the District of Delaware.

Biography 

Noreika earned her Bachelor of Science from Lehigh University, her Master of Arts in biology from Columbia University, and her Juris Doctor, magna cum laude, from the University of Pittsburgh School of Law, where she was inducted into the Order of the Coif and served as a member of the University of Pittsburgh Law Review.

She began her legal career as an associate at Morris, Nichols, Arsht & Tunnell in Wilmington, Delaware, upon graduation from law school in 1993. During her 25 years at Morris Nichols, Noreika served as counsel in more than 500 cases, while specializing in patent law, and representing parties in cases involving biotechnology, chemistry, consumer products, computer science, medical devices, and pharmaceuticals. Noreika worked at Morris, Nichols, Arsht & Tunnell until she became a judge.

Federal judicial service 

On December 20, 2017, President Donald Trump nominated Noreika to serve as a United States District Judge of the United States District Court for the District of Delaware, to the seat vacated by Judge Gregory M. Sleet, who assumed senior status on May 1, 2017. On February 14, 2018, a hearing on her nomination was held before the Senate Judiciary Committee On March 15, 2018, her nomination was reported out of committee by a voice vote. On August 1, 2018, her nomination was confirmed by a voice vote. She received her judicial commission on August 9, 2018. Maryellen Noreika has been considered a potential nominee for a federal judgeship in the Federal Circuit by President Joe Biden.

References

External links 
 

1966 births
Living people
20th-century American lawyers
21st-century American lawyers
21st-century American judges
Columbia Graduate School of Arts and Sciences alumni
Delaware Democrats
Delaware lawyers
Judges of the United States District Court for the District of Delaware
Lehigh University alumni
United States district court judges appointed by Donald Trump
University of Pittsburgh School of Law alumni
20th-century American women lawyers
21st-century American women lawyers
21st-century American women judges